Winterset Township is a township in Russell County, Kansas, United States. As of the 2010 United States Census, it had a population of 67.

Geography
The center of Winterset Township is located at  (38.7400119, −98.9856462) at an elevation of 1,804 feet (550 m). The township lies in the Smoky Hills region of the Great Plains. The Smoky Hill River runs through the township, entering its west-central part, flowing windingly northeast, and then exiting through the township's northeast corner.

According to the records kept by the United States Census Bureau, Winterset Township comprises an area of 36.0 square miles (93.2 km) of which 35.98 square miles (93.2 km) is land and 0.02 square miles (0.1 km) is water. Forming the southwest corner of Russell County, the township contains no incorporated settlements and borders Big Creek Township to the north, Grant Township to the northeast, Lincoln Township to the east, Barton County's Fairview Township to the south, Rush County's Pleasantdale Township to the southwest, and Ellis County's Freedom and Victoria Townships to the west.

Demographics

As of the 2010 census, there were 67 people, 30 households, and 24 families residing in the township. The population density was 1.9 people per square mile (0.7/km). There were 30 housing units at an average density of 0.83 per square mile (0.32/km). The racial makeup of the township was 98.5% White and 1.5% from two or more races. Hispanic or Latino of any race were 6.0% of the population.

There were 30 households, out of which 20.0% had children under the age of 18 living with them, 66.7% were married couples living together, 10.0% had a male householder with no wife present, 3.3% had a female householder with no husband present, and 20.0% were non-families. 16.7% of all households were made up of individuals, and 10.0% had someone living alone who was 65 years of age or older. The average household size was 2.23 and the average family size was 2.46.

In the township, the population was spread out, with 14.9% under the age of 18, 8.9% from 18 to 24, 7.5% from 25 to 44, 40.3% from 45 to 64, and 28.4% who were 65 years of age or older. The median age was 53.5 years. For every 100 females, there were 116.1 males. For every 100 females age 18 and over, there were 137.5 males.

Education
Winterset Township lies within unified school district 407, Russell County Schools.

Transportation
A network of mostly unpaved county roads laid out in a rough grid pattern covers the township. One paved road, Balta-Galatia Road, runs north–south through the eastern part of the township.

References

Townships in Russell County, Kansas
Townships in Kansas